Shrewsbury–Lansdowne I-44 is a St. Louis MetroLink station. It is located on Lansdowne Avenue at River Des Peres Boulevard in St. Louis, Missouri near its boundary with Shrewsbury in St. Louis County. The city limits line between the two communities runs through the northern portion of the park and ride lot. The station is also a large MetroBus transfer and is equipped with a kiss-and-ride turnaround, 800 park and ride spaces, and 25 long term spaces. The station primarily serves River Des Peres Park and the dense residential neighborhoods in southwest city and Shrewsbury.

In 2006, Metro's Arts in Transit program commissioned the sculpture Aquilone by Doug Hollis for installation on the embankment next to the station. The steel and aluminum sculptures are composed of tetrahedral wind-vanes that frame smaller, perforated wind sails that rotate independently, animating the entire surface. The whole piece turns into the wind as the nine sculptures dance with each other.

In 2014, the Arts in Transit program commissioned a second sculpture for the station by artist Ben Fehrmann called London. It's made out of 900, 13-foot tall stainless steel rods and was placed in the station's passenger plaza.

Station layout
The station has an elevated island platform that is accessed by a staircase and switchback ramp on the north end of the platform and an elevator and another staircase on the south end.

Previous Extension Proposal
The platform at this station is designed to accommodate a future extension of the line, either via the River des Peres to the southeast or more southerly toward South County Center. This extension is called MetroSouth and is one of the original Cross County Corridors. Currently, there are no plans to advance studies on this alignment as the region focuses on a route within the city of St. Louis that would run primarily on Jefferson and Natural Bridge Avenues.

References

External links
 St. Louis Metro

MetroLink stations in St. Louis
MetroLink stations in St. Louis County, Missouri
Railway stations in the United States opened in 2006
Blue Line (St. Louis MetroLink)